De Jansmolen or De Modden is a Hollow Post mill in Goëngahuizen, Friesland, Netherlands which has been restored as a landscape feature. The mill is listed as a Rijksmonument, number 34000.

History

The date that De Jansmolen was built is unknown. The mill was marked on a map of Smallingerland dated 1848. The mill was at work until 1952. The mill was restored in 1954 and 1967. On 9 November 1978, the mill was sold to Stichting De Fryske Mole. The mill was restored again in 1990.

Description

De Jansmolen is what the Dutch describe as an spinnenkop. It is a hollow post mill on a single-storey square roundhouse. The mill is winded by tailpole and winch. The roundhouse is clad in pantiles and mill body is covered in vertical boards, while the roof of the mill is boarded vertically and covered in felt. The sails are Common sails. The sails are carried on a cast-iron  windshaft. Apart from the brake wheel, the mill is devoid of machinery.

Public access
De Jansmolen is open by appointment.

References

Buildings and structures completed in the 19th century
Windmills in Friesland
Hollow post mills in the Netherlands
Windpumps in the Netherlands
Rijksmonuments in Friesland